R-500 may refer to:

 A military version of the Warner Scarab aircraft engine
 A missile for the Russian Iskander-K (9M728) missile system

See also
 R500 (disambiguation), including roads